Friedrich Gerhard Rohlfs (14 April 1831 – 2 June 1896) was a German geographer, explorer, author and adventurer.

Biography
Friedrich Gerhard Rohlfs was born at Vegesack, now part of Bremen. His father was a physician, and there was much pressure on Rohlfs to join the field of medicine. After the ordinary course at the gymnasium of Osnabrück, he entered the Bremen corps in 1848, and took part as a volunteer in the Schleswig-Holstein campaign, being made an officer after the battle of Idstedt (July 1850). Rohlfs then became a medical student, and studied at the universities of Heidelberg, Würzburg, and Göttingen. He wanted to travel, and joined the French Foreign Legion in a medical capacity, serving during the conquest of Kabylia. He attained the highest rank open to a foreigner, and was decorated for bravery as Chevalier of the Legion of Honour. Having learned Arabic and the mode of life of the inhabitants, in 1861 he went to Morocco, and was for some time personal physician to a nobleman there.

Rohlfs then set off on his own, exploring the oases of Morocco. During this trip he was attacked and left for dead, his leg almost severed from his body. These injuries would keep him from returning to Europe for most of his life, the cold weather aggravating them. In 1864 he continued his travels in Morocco, and crossed the Atlas Mountains to the oasis of Tuat. His description and map of the country were the first made from personal observation and with scientific knowledge.

After this trip, and a short visit to Germany, Rohlfs returned to Africa, and, disguised as an Arab (going so far as to have himself circumcised), was the first European to cross Africa from Tripoli across the Sahara desert via Lake Chad and along the Niger River and to present-day Lagos on the Gulf of Guinea from 1865-1867. He was the second European explorer to visit the region of the Draa River in southern Morocco. For this work he was awarded the Patron's Medal of the Royal Geographical Society of London in 1868. Rohlfs's detailed account of it is contained in the Ergänzungsheft ("Supplement") No. 34 to Petermann's Geographische Mittheilungen (Gotha, 1872).

At the close of 1867, by order of the king of Prussia, he joined the British punitive expedition to Abyssinia. He returned to Tripoli in 1868, and in 1869 traversed the desert from Tripoli to Alexandria, visiting the oasis of Siwah, site of the ancient cult of Jupiter Ammon. Returning to Germany, he married and settled down in Weimar.

In 1873, with an expedition of 100 camels and 90 men, organized under the patronage of the khedive of Egypt Isma'il Pasha, Rohlfs explored the Libyan desert west of the chain of oases which skirt the valley of the Nile, and discovered that the depression called the Bahr Bela-ma (river without water), marked on many maps of the desert at that time, did not exist. In 1874 Rohlfs set out from Dakhla Oasis intending to reach Kufra. Accompanied by Karl Zittel and a surveyor called Jordans, Rohlfs and his colleagues experienced a torrential downpour - a rare occurrence in the desert. Rohlfs' team restocked and watered their camels and built a cairn at the place he named Regenfeld ("Rain field"). The westward progress of the expedition continued to be hampered by the north-south dune ridges of the Great Sand Sea  which the loaded camels were unable to climb. The party was forced to head northwest along the easier inter-dune corridors and reached Siwa.

In 1875, he visited the United States, and lectured on his travels. In 1878 Rohlfs and Anton Stecker (1855-1888) were commissioned by the German African Society to go to Wadai. They succeeded in reaching the oasis of Kufra, one of the chief centres of the Senussites, but being attacked by Arabs, they were obliged to retreat, making their way to the coast at Benghazi, reached in October 1879. In 1880 Rohlfs accompanied Stecker in an exploring expedition to Abyssinia; but after delivering a letter from the German emperor to the Negus, he returned to Europe.

In 1885, when the rivalry between the British and Germans in East Africa was very keen, Otto von Bismarck appointed Rohlfs consul at Zanzibar, which Bismarck desired to secure for Germany. Rohlfs, untrained in diplomacy, was no match for John Kirk, the British agent, and he was soon recalled. He did not visit Africa again.

Bibliography
.
.
.
 Von Tripolis nach Alexandria (1871)
 Quer durch Afrika (1874–75)
 Beiträge zur Entdeckung und Erforschung Afrikas (1876)
 Reise von Tripolis nach der Oase Kufra (1881)
 Quid Novi ex Africa (1886)

References

External links 
 
 
 Gerhard-Rohlfs.de, works by Gerhard Rohlfs
 

1831 births
1896 deaths
Physicians from Bremen (state)
German geographers
German explorers of Africa
19th-century German botanists
German travel writers
Soldiers of the French Foreign Legion
Chevaliers of the Légion d'honneur
German male non-fiction writers